Eva Carin Beatrice Ask (born 20 April 1956) is a Swedish politician and a member of the Moderate Party. She has served as Governor of Södermanland County since 1 January 2020.

Ask served as member of the Swedish Riksdag for Stockholm Municipality from 1994 to 2019. She was Minister for Schools from 1991 to 1994 and Minister for Justice from 2006 to 2014

Biography 
Ask was born in Sveg, Jämtland County. She earned a high school diploma in Akron, Ohio, United States, in 1974, and finished her upper secondary school in Sweden in 1976. From 1978 to 1979, she studied international economics at Uppsala University but never graduated. Instead, she began working for the Moderate Party and the Moderate Youth League, before being elected the first female chairman of the youth league in 1984. She was re-elected in 1986, and served a second term until 1988, when she was elected city commissioner with responsibility for schools in the city council of Stockholm.

Following the 1991 election, after which Carl Bildt became Prime Minister, Ask was appointed Minister for Schools and Adult Education in the new cabinet. Together with Per Unckel, Minister for Education, she took part in shaking the very foundation of the Swedish education system. Among other things, education vouchers were introduced which allowed children to choose independent schools without paying any fees.

Since the loss in the 1994 election, Ask has served as party spokesman of several issues. From 1994 to 2006, she was member of the Swedish parliament.

Following the 2006 election, after which Fredrik Reinfeldt became Prime Minister, Ask was appointed Minister for Justice in the new cabinet. Historically, she is one of very few non-jurists to hold the post of Minister for Justice in Sweden.

She has been criticized by newspapers and fellow politicians in her role as a Minister of Justice, most notably for her part in the change in legislation regulating the National Defence Radio Establishment, as well as her proposal to send lavender-colored envelopes to suspected purchasers of sexual acts, with the head of the Swedish Bar Association, Anne Ramberg, calling the latter "an unacceptable view of human beings. It is a return to medieval times". After the news of the Swedish police controlling the citizenships of fare evaders in the Stockholm subway, Ask supported the REVA project and continuing in-country foreigner checks. An open letter to the minister describing the more recent public uproar has received worldwide attention, and was carried in the New York Times, written in opposition of police actions in Stockholm.

In January 2014, she shared a link on Facebook to a satirical website article about marijuana killing 37 people in the US following the legalization in the state of Colorado, and tied it to her anti-drug stand as a youth politician. Her post was ridiculed and criticized after it spread on social media. Her press secretary later told the Aftonbladet newspaper that the minister had all the time been aware that the article was satirical.

At the end of her time in office as Minister for Justice, she was the fourth longest-serving person to the hold the office out of 41 individuals. She was second deputy leader of the Moderate Party from 2009 to 2015.

Personal life 
Ask was formerly in a relationship with Moderate Party politician Christer G. Wennerholm, with whom she has one child. She has a second child from another relationship.

References

External links 
Beatrice Ask at the Government Offices of Sweden
Beatrice Ask at the Parliament of Sweden 
Beatrice Ask at the Moderate Party 
Beatrice Ask 

1956 births
Living people
People from Härjedalen Municipality
People from Härjedalen
Uppsala University alumni
Swedish Ministers for Schools
Swedish Ministers for Justice
Women members of the Riksdag
Swedish feminists
Women government ministers of Sweden
Members of the Riksdag 1988–1991
Members of the Riksdag 1991–1994
Members of the Riksdag 1994–1998
Members of the Riksdag 1998–2002
Members of the Riksdag 2002–2006
Members of the Riksdag 2006–2010
Members of the Riksdag 2010–2014
Members of the Riksdag 2014–2018
Members of the Riksdag 2018–2022
21st-century Swedish women politicians
Female justice ministers
Members of the Riksdag from the Moderate Party
20th-century Swedish women politicians
20th-century Swedish politicians